Nidup Zangpo is a Bhutanese politician who has been a Bhutan Peace and Prosperity Party (DPT) member of the National Assembly of Bhutan from 2013 to 2018.

Zangpo gained a Bachelor's Degree in Arts and worked for the Amankora Group before being elected to the National Assembly of Bhutan on July 13, 2013.

References

Year of birth missing (living people)
Living people
Bhutanese MNAs 2013–2018
21st-century Bhutanese politicians
Druk Phuensum Tshogpa politicians
Bhutanese politicians
Druk Phuensum Tshogpa MNAs